Judith Meulendijks (born 26 September 1978, Helmond) is a former badminton player from the Netherlands.

Career
Meulendijks started playing badminton at the BC Phoenix in her hometown and then she went to BC Geldrop. In her junior career, she won 1994 Dutch junior championships in the girls' doubles partnered with Antoinette Achterberg, and in 1995 in the mixed doubles with Dicky Palyama. In 1996, she elected to join the national team, and at the same year she won the national women's singles title. In 2007, she won the gold medal at the European Junior Championships in the girls' singles event, and also became the first of world-class junior players to make a mark on the International Badminton Federation tournament circuit when she took the women's singles title at the Dutch Open.

In 2000, she competed at the Sydney Olympics in women's singles and was beaten in round of 32 by Ye Zhaoying, of China, 11-3, 9-11, 11-7. Meulendijks was a part of the Dutch team who won the 2002 bronze and 2006 silver at the Uber Cup.

She won the Dutch National Badminton Championships three times in the Women's singles category (1996, 2008 & 2012) and the Women's doubles two times (2006 & 2007) with Brenda Beenhakker. She ended her international singles career in style reaching the finals at her home Dutch Open event  in 2012 were she lost to Czech player Kristina Gavnholt. She played for many clubs in the Netherlands (BC Phoenix, BC Geldrop, Pellikaan Tilburg, BC Nuenen, BCO Bali & BC Duinwijck), Germany (FC Langenfeld & Bayer Uerdingen with which she won the German Bundesliga title in 2002 & 2003) and Denmark (Team Aarhus & Vendsyssel). She now is a badminton coach in Switzerland.

Major achievements

References

External links
BWF Player Profile
Home page

1978 births
Living people
Indo people
Sportspeople from Helmond
Dutch people of Indonesian descent
Dutch female badminton players
Olympic badminton players of the Netherlands
Badminton players at the 2000 Summer Olympics